The women's football tournament at the 2006 Asian Games was held from 30 November to 13 December 2006 in Doha, Qatar.

Squads

Results
All times are Arabia Standard Time (UTC+03:00)

Preliminary round

Group A

Group B

Knockout round

Semifinals

Bronze medal match

Gold medal match

Goalscorers

Final standing

References

RSSSF

External links
 Official men football schedule 
 Official women football schedule

Women